In enzymology, a N-succinylarginine dihydrolase is an enzyme that catalyzes the chemical reaction

N2-succinyl-L-arginine + 2 H2O  N2-succinyl-L-ornithine + 2 NH3 + CO2

Thus, the two substrates of this enzyme are N2-succinyl-L-arginine and H2O, whereas its 3 products are N2-succinyl-L-ornithine, NH3, and CO2.

This enzyme belongs to the family of hydrolases, those acting on carbon-nitrogen bonds other than peptide bonds, specifically in linear amidines.  The systematic name of this enzyme class is N2-succinyl-L-arginine iminohydrolase (decarboxylating). Other names in common use include N2-succinylarginine dihydrolase, arginine succinylhydrolase, SADH, AruB, AstB, and 2-N-succinyl-L-arginine iminohydrolase (decarboxylating).  This enzyme participates in arginine and proline metabolism.

References

 
 
 
 
 

EC 3.5.3
Enzymes of unknown structure